Jean Proriol (born 25 November 1934) is a French politician of the Union for a Popular Movement (UMP), currently serving in the National Assembly from the second district of Haute-Loire (Le Puy-Brioude).

Proriol was born in Beauzac, Haute-Loire. He has been the Mayor of Beauzac since October 1962, and has been President of the Departmental Association of Mayors of Haute-Loire since 1979. He also became a member of the General Council of Haute-Loire in October 1962, where he served until March 1992; from March 1985 to March 1992, he was Vice-President of the General Council.

From October 1974 to March 1978, Proriol was a member of the French Senatefrom Haute-Loire. In the March 1978 legislative election, he was elected to the National Assembly, and he has been re-elected in every election since then. He was Secretary of the National Assembly from April 1993 to April 1997 and from June 2002 to June 2007.

He has been a member of the Regional Council of Auvergne since March 1992. He was previously Vice-President of the Regional Council from March 1986 to June 1988, and he was First Vice-President in charge of economic development from March 1992 to March 2004.

References

Politicians of the French Fifth Republic
1934 births
Living people
Emlyon Business School alumni
Deputies of the 12th National Assembly of the French Fifth Republic
Deputies of the 13th National Assembly of the French Fifth Republic
Senators of Haute-Loire